The Association of Genealogists & Researchers in Archives is the professional association for genealogists and researchers in archives in England and Wales.

References 

Genealogical societies
Organisations based in the London Borough of Islington
Professional associations based in the United Kingdom